Easy Goer (March 21, 1986 – May 12, 1994) was an American Champion Hall of Fame Thoroughbred racehorse known for earning American Champion Two-Year-Old Colt honors in 1988 and defeating 1989 American Horse of the Year Sunday Silence in the Belmont Stakes by eight lengths. Both horses were later voted into the American Hall of Fame. The victory deprived Sunday Silence of the Triple Crown. It was also the second-fastest Belmont in history, behind only the record performance of Secretariat in 1973. Easy Goer was the first two-year-old champion to win a Triple Crown race since Spectacular Bid in 1979.

Easy Goer is the only horse in racing history to win the Belmont, Whitney, Travers, Woodward and Jockey Club Gold Cup and the only 3-year-old to win the Whitney, Woodward and Jockey Club Gold Cup while defeating older horses in the latter three. Easy Goer is one of only two horses to win the Champagne, Belmont, and Travers.  He is also one of only two horses to notch a Belmont Stakes, Whitney and Travers triple, and the only one to do so in the same year.   Additionally, he is one of only five horses to tally a Whitney-Travers double in the same year.   Since 1919, Easy Goer is one of only ten horses to sweep the Belmont, Travers and Jockey Club Gold Cup.  Since 1973, Easy Goer is one of only eight horses that have won three consecutive Grade I races longer than  miles on dirt (or synthetic).   On the Blood-Horse List of the Top 100 U.S. Racehorses of the 20th Century, Easy Goer is ranked #34.

Racing career
Bred and owned by Ogden Phipps, Easy Goer was a son of Alydar out of the 1981 American Champion Older Female Horse Relaxing (by Buckpasser).  Trained by Shug McGaughey and ridden by Pat Day, the uncommonly muscular,  big, powerful, long-striding  chestnut colt with a white star won 14 of his 20 races, including nine Grade I wins at distances of seven furlongs, eight furlongs, nine furlongs, ten furlongs and twelve furlongs, and placed second five times.    Easy Goer's racing career was also marked by his closely matched rivalry with Sunday Silence, who held a three to one edge in their head-to-head races. Easy Goer defeated Sunday Silence by eight lengths in the Belmont and finished second to him in the Kentucky Derby by two and a half lengths, Preakness by a nose and Breeders' Cup Classic by a neck. Both horses were later voted into the American Hall of Fame. McGaughey described Easy Goer as, "a big, strong horse, and jockey Pat Day helped him by not crucifying him in his races and bringing me back something. He had soundness problems, but we stayed on top of it.  His action was so athletic, so natural, so fluid; he glided over the track; he ran very fast and did it so easily.  He captured the public; he was a brilliantly fast horse, exciting to watch, and he had a great following. I had always dreamed of having a horse like Easy Goer.  Easy Goer is by far the best that I've ever had."    Day stated, "Easy Goer was the best horse I ever rode. He was the most talented and he had a big engine and a lot of heart and desire. He did what he did with continuing ailments."  Racing writer Steve Haskin described Easy Goer as "Adonis-like, the closest thing physically to Secretariat. He was plagued by terrible ankles his entire career, but was placed upon a throne at an early age and justified all the adoration.  Easy Goer was a horse with God-given talent who appeared to have everything – looks, class, pedigree, speed, and stamina."   Racing writer Edward L. Bowen said: "Easy Goer was a glowing chestnut with a fluid stride that belied his short pasterns and less than perfect foot. Pasterns notwithstanding, he had the look of greatness, and he ran to his looks.  He was a horse who tempted horsemen and fans to slip into their thoughts the phrase, 'the most perfect horse you can imagine.'  Easy Goer was large but not too large. He was elegant but not dainty. He was powerful but not gross. To the aesthete taking in the whole rather than haggling over the parts, the dictionary simply proved inadequate: Easy Goer was not just perfect, he was "damned perfect."   Blood-Horse pedigree analyst Avalyn Hunter's assessment of Easy Goer was that "Easy Goer combined blistering speed over a mile with thoroughly genuine stamina."   Tom LaMarra, of Blood-Horse, wrote:  "Easy Goer is mentioned in the same breath with some of the greatest horses of all time."   Joe Drape of The New York Times described Easy Goer as a "powerful, massive, raw talent with an enormous stride."  Hall of Fame trainer John Veitch stated, "Easy Goer had more weapons and was more versatile than his father Alydar."   Bud Delp, trainer of Spectacular Bid, said, "I hadn't seen the kind of pistonlike action in a horse since Spectacular Bid. Easy Goer had the same kind of stride, which was effortless."   His running style was multifaceted and flexible, and he was able to adjust to racing conditions; he could go to the lead or come from behind, he was able to put pressure on speed horses and stay with a faster pace, or drop back if needed. Among his peak performances, Easy Goer ran 124 and 122 Beyer Speed Figures. Easy Goer also routinely ran in the 120 Beyer Speed Figure range on a regular basis in his races, while arch-rival Sunday Silence did so rarely and only when it was required for him to prevail. It is noteworthy that Easy Goer's overall speed figures were substantially superior to principal rival Sunday Silence, despite Sunday Silence's slight three to one edge in their head-to-head races. Furthermore, Easy Goer ran the fastest Beyer Speed Figure performance by any two-year-old, as well as the fastest Beyer Speed Figure performance in any Triple Crown race since Beyer racing figures were first published.

1988: two-year-old season
Before his career began, Easy Goer was shipped to McGaughey at the Payson Park Training Center in Indiantown, Florida, where he spent the winter getting acquainted with the starting gate and underwent basic training. His trainer noted some faults in his conformation. He had puffy, problematic ankles, a clubfoot, and a turned-out left knee, all providing the potential for injury once the horse began serious workouts. However, McGaughey was captivated with Easy Goer the first time he saw him, but really felt he had something special when he watched him for the first time with a set of horses. "He gave the impression he could gallop those horses to death," McGaughey said.
  
Easy Goer's time was notably impressive taking into account that it was approximately fifteen lengths faster than that aforementioned maiden race run at the same distance that day at Saratoga. Easy Goer came out of that race with a sore left shin. McGaughey was concerned because he thought he might have to stop the colt's training; however, treatment by hosing and poulticing the leg to draw out the heat was successful. McGaughey decided to wait and have Easy Goer's legs further treated after the Breeders' Cup that November. Easy Goer continued to train at Saratoga. Easy Goer's time was particularly exceptional considering that on the same day at Belmont, older allowance horses ran the same distance just under two seconds slower. His trainer said after the race, "Then I knew I was training something special." Three weeks after that near-record performance, Easy Goer next won the seven-furlong Grade I Cowdin Stakes with little encouragement, defeating Is It True again by four lengths. He also defeated Canadian Champion Two-Year-Old Colt Mercedes Won, who was the Hopeful Stakes and Florida Derby winner. The final time was more than two seconds off Devil's Bag's 1983 stakes record, but the Belmont track was producing uncommonly slow times that day. He also defeated the Belmont Futurity winner Trapp Mountain and Young America Stakes winner Irish Actor. His  final time for the mile was three-fifths of a second off the Champagne stakes record, and tied for fourth-fastest in Champagne Stakes history behind Vitriolic, Seattle Slew, and Devil's Bag. In the Frizette Stakes run at the same distance that day at Belmont, future Hall of Fame champion Open Mind fell a nose short of catching Some Romance at the wire. Additionally, in this Champagne Stakes, Easy Goer ran the fastest Beyer Speed Figure performance (116 Beyer) of any two-year-old since Beyer racing figures were first published. Racing analyst Andrew Beyer stated, "Easy Goer was the most brilliant American two-year-old of the decade." Racing writer Steven Crist stated, "Easy Goer is among the fastest two-year-olds of the last two decades."

Three weeks after the Champagne Stakes, he finished second by a little more than a length in his last race of his two-year-old season, the Grade 1 Breeders' Cup Juvenile on a muddy track at Churchill Downs. He lost to Is It True, a horse he had defeated three times earlier in the year by a combined ten and a half lengths, having jumped the tire tracks left by the starting gate late in the homestretch, and seemed to be struggling and uncomfortable with the muddy Churchill track.  He earned $697,500 and was named Champion two-year-old colt and was the early favorite for the Kentucky Derby. After the Breeders' Cup, he was shipped to New York to have his shins pinfired, and then sent to Gulfstream Park in Hallandale, Florida, to recuperate.

1989: three-year-old season
At three, Easy Goer started his year in Florida by winning the Swale Stakes in the fastest seven furlongs of the Gulfstream Park meeting in a time of  while carrying ten pounds more than the runner up. He "exploded" around the far turn to an almost nine length win defeating Kentucky Jockey Club Stakes and Nassau County Stakes winner Tricky Creek. He then won the one mile Grade II Gotham Stakes by thirteen lengths in stakes and track record time while conceding nine pounds and five pounds to the second and third-place finishers respectively, including future world record holder (on turf at one mile) Expensive Decision, winner of the Kelso Handicap and Saranac Handicap. His next race was the mile and an eighth Grade I Wood Memorial, which in 1989 was run two weeks after the Gotham Stakes and two weeks before the Kentucky Derby. Easy Goer ran close to the lead the entire race and won by three lengths over Federico Tesio Stakes winner Rock Point. He was timed in a relatively moderate . However, students of time pointed out that Aqueduct was playing about two seconds slower than normal on the day.

Rivalry with Sunday Silence
Easy Goer was most remembered for his rivalry with Sunday Silence.  The two first met in the 1989 Kentucky Derby, run on May 6, with Easy Goer going into the Derby off only 13 days rest running previously in the Wood Memorial, run on April 22; with Sunday Silence going into the Derby off a full month's rest running prior in the Santa Anita Derby, run on April 8.  Sunday Silence won the Derby by  lengths over Easy Goer in the relatively slow time of 2:05 on a muddy track similar to the Breeders' Cup Juvenile the previous year. Easy Goer had a small crack in his left front heel that was found the week leading into the Kentucky Derby. The crack was serious enough to cause discomfort and possibly keep him from running. Easy Goer had a history for his difficulty to handle a muddy track at Churchill Downs and seemed to be struggling with the footing. Easy Goer also had traffic trouble in the race, being cut off by Northern Wolf during the first quarter-mile, causing him to check, and Dansil drifted into his path in the final eighth of a mile in the home stretch, causing Easy Goer to alter course. Multiple Grade I winner Awe Inspiring finished third. Sunday Silence won in spite of swerving in sharply to the left bumping into Northern Wolf, then veering out, while being hit by Valenzuela in the home stretch.

After the Derby, both horses returned to action two weeks later in the 1989 Preakness Stakes. Throughout Preakness week, as late as the day before the race, Easy Goer's front feet were being soaked in a tub of Epsom salts due to small scratches or cracks on both heels. His ankles and knees were also given ultrasound. Easy Goer, after breaking in the air at the start,  made a big, early move down the backstretch which catapulted him to a two-length lead over Sunday Silence with a half mile remaining, with the six-furlong split being run in a rapid . Jockey Pat Day was criticized for reining Easy Goer's head sideways to the right in deep stretch with a short lead right before the finish line. Day criticized himself, calling his ride "a mistake." Bill Christine of the Los Angeles Times, and trainer McGaughey also expressed their opinions on the mistakes they thought Day made during the race. After the race, Day went to McGaughey's barn at Pimlico, after he had been criticized for his ride. Day said, "It ran through my mind that I might lose the mount on Easy Goer," Day said. "But then I shared some thoughts--I won't tell you what--with Shug and I felt better."

After the Preakness, both rivals returned to action three weeks later in the 1989 Belmont Stakes.   During that era, New York was the only state in America that banned all race-day drugs and medications;  New York didn't allow horses to race on any drugs, while the rest of the country did.   The trainer of Sunday Silence, Charlie Whittingham, was angered that the controversial veterinarian Alex Harthill, who treated Sunday Silence earlier for the Kentucky Derby and Preakness, was not licensed in New York and prohibited from practicing.    When the gate opened, both Easy Goer and Sunday Silence ran in close attendance to the pace-setting leader through swift early fractions, with Easy Goer making his move around the turn propelling himself to the lead; he then opened up a substantial lead through the stretch. Easy Goer defeated Sunday Silence by eight lengths in the time of 2:26  producing the second fastest Belmont Stakes in history, behind Secretariat, and denied Sunday Silence the Triple Crown.  Easy Goer became the first two-year-old champion to win a Triple Crown race since Spectacular Bid in 1979.  In the process, Easy Goer seemed to vindicate his reputation as the reigning champion two year-old. The jockey of Sunday Silence, Pat Valenzuela, described Easy Goer's performance as that of a superhorse.  The race was run over a fast but not unusually quick track. Easy Goer earned a 122 Beyer Speed Figure, the best in any Triple Crown race since these ratings were first published in 1987.

Remainder of season
Easy Goer went on that year to win the mile and an eighth Grade I Whitney Handicap at Saratoga, defeating older horses by over four lengths in near record time while earning another lofty 119 Beyer Speed Figure.  The older horses he defeated in this Whitney were: Cryptoclearance, earner of just under $3.4 million and winner of the Donn Handicap, Pegasus Stakes, and Widener Handicap;  Brooklyn Handicap, Nassau County and Excelsior Handicap winner Forever Silver;  Stuyvesant Handicap, Queens County Handicap, and Stymie Handicap winner It's Academic; and Fayette Handicap and Ben Ali Handicap winner Homebuilder. He missed the stakes and track record in the Whitney by 2/5 of a second.  The record was then held by Tri Jet, the only horse to ever run a faster Whitney than Easy Goer. Easy Goer earned the time even though he steadied while being trapped and boxed in around the far turn, and he ran his last eighth of a mile in eleven and two-fifth seconds.  McGaughey said after the race, "I don't know if I've ever seen a horse run the last eighth of a mile that fast going long on the dirt. Sometimes, you see it on the grass when a horse has gone a slow paced mile."   Two weeks later at Saratoga, he won the $1.08 million mile and a quarter Grade I Travers Stakes over Grade I Arlington Classic winner Clever Trevor with moderate effort by three lengths also in near-record time while earning another outstanding 121 Beyer Speed Figure.  He missed the Travers record by 4/5 of a second. It was the third fastest in Travers history, behind General Assembly and Honest Pleasure.   Trainer Jerry Hollendorfer decided to skip the Travers with Haskell Invitational Stakes and Hollywood Futurity winner King Glorious primarily because, during that era, New York banned all race-day drugs and medications, and King Glorious had been treated with Lasix in all nine of his races.  New York didn't allow horses to race on any drugs, while the rest of the country did.   The trainer of Sunday Silence, Charlie Whittingham, may have chosen to skip the Travers because he was angered that the controversial veterinarian Alex Harthill, who treated Sunday Silence earlier in the year, was not licensed in New York and prohibited from practicing.  He also may have chosen to skip the Travers to rest the horse, as he didn't run Sunday Silence in any race during that month of August.  Easy Goer then won the $809,000 mile and a quarter Grade I Woodward Stakes by two lengths on a muddy track, again defeating older horses while carrying more weight and being stuck in traffic, boxed in on the rail and checking hard twice. Easy Goer's victory seemingly squashed the perception that muddy or wet tracks were his Achilles' heel.  Day said after the race, "Mud is different everywhere."  The older horses he defeated in this Woodward were: Metropolitan Handicap, Arkansas Derby and Philip H. Iselin Stakes winner Proper Reality; and Oaklawn Handicap and Gulfstream Park Handicap winner Slew City Slew. This was the final time the Woodward was run at the mile and a quarter distance before being permanently shortened in distance to a mile and an eighth. Three weeks later, he won the $1.09 million mile and a half Grade I Jockey Club Gold Cup by four lengths, again defeating older horses, included among them were the aforementioned Cryptoclearance, who finished second. He also defeated Breeders' Cup Turf and Molson Export Million winner Prized by over 20 lengths in this race, a horse who had defeated Sunday Silence earlier in the year in the Grade II Swaps Stakes.  The track was playing dull and slow, but despite the dullness of the racing surface, moderate pace, and relatively slow final time, he ran his sixth and final quarter-mile his fastest, coming home in 24.12 seconds while running another superb 120 Beyer Speed Figure.   This was the final time the Jockey Club Gold Cup was run at the mile and a half distance prior to being permanently shortened in distance to a mile and a quarter.

The rivalry with Sunday Silence concluded in the Breeders' Cup Classic, run on November 4 at  miles. With champion honors at stake, the race was labeled "Race of the Decade" by the horse racing media. Easy Goer was favored by the wagering public based on his Belmont Stakes win and four subsequent Grade I wins, three against older horses. Sunday Silence's regular rider, Patrick Valenzuela, had recently been suspended for cocaine use. Trainer Charles E. Whittingham assigned the mount to Chris McCarron. Easy Goer came into the 10-furlong Classic off the 12-furlong Gold Cup, run on October 7—a potentially difficult parlay for a trainer, because the longer race can have the hazardous consequence of dulling the colt's natural speed and blunting the quickness that he might need in a shorter race, while generating the horse's stamina at the expense of speediness. In contrast, trainer Charlie Whittingham had run Sunday Silence only twice in the five months since the Belmont, both times over a -mile distance—in the Grade II Swaps Stakes at Hollywood Park, where he finished second, and two months later in the Sept. 24 Super Derby at Louisiana Downs, which he won, giving him six weeks rest into the Classic. Sunday Silence then made a charge turning for home and gained the lead in the final furlong, four lengths ahead of Easy Goer. Both Sunday Silence and Easy Goer earned brilliant 124 speed figures in the 1989 Breeders' Cup Classic, which tied for the highest speed figure earned in any Breeders' Cup race. Blushing John, the American Champion Older Dirt Male Horse that year, finished behind the top two in third. The victory assured Sunday Silence Eclipse Award for Outstanding Three-Year-Old Male Horse and Horse of the Year honors for 1989. After the race, McGaughey said, "Sunday Silence had a perfect trip and we made a couple of mistakes. Pat and I agree that he made riding mistakes in the Preakness. But in the other races, there were circumstances that contributed to what happened. Maybe when Pat grabbed him after the start, the horse didn't understand what he was doing. Then Pat was content to sit and wait behind Sunday Silence, as he had done before, and the other horse got away from us. In my heart, I think Easy Goer is the better horse;  I think anybody would say that if those two ran against each other ten times, each would probably win five." Day said his ride wasn't the best, while also stating, "I've said it before, I think Easy Goer was better than Sunday Silence, despite his three to one edge in a head-to-head races. I'll go to my grave believing that. We lost two photos to him and the one in the Preakness was due to a rider error on my part." Current Daily Racing Form publisher Steven Crist stated in his New York Times article in January 1990 that had the question on the ballot been, "Who is the better horse, Sunday Silence or Easy Goer?", his view was that a lot more than 19 people would have voted against Sunday Silence. Crist also stated, "Easy Goer was a great horse and so was Sunday Silence. I still think Easy Goer had more pure, raw talent. Sunday Silence held the three to one edge over Easy Goer in the races they met, but he never beat him in a way that proved he was just plain better. In Easy Goer's best race, he walloped Sunday Silence by eight lengths in the Belmont. In a few of his close defeats, Easy Goer had legitimate excuses: he lost the Derby on a muddy track he had difficulty handling, and lost the Preakness by only a nose after a dubious ride. In the Classic, where Sunday Silence held him off by a neck, Easy Goer just missed, but left no one thinking it could not have gone the other way." Daily Racing Form's Mike Watchmaker concurred, stating, "To this day, you won't have any trouble finding people who believe that Easy Goer was a better racehorse than Sunday Silence. I know this, because I am one of them." "Paul Moran of the Los Angeles Times and Newsday agreed, stating, "Sunday Silence is Horse of the Year, but most still believe Easy Goer is the better horse. Sunday Silence is Horse of the Year despite never having won at a mile and a half (the classic distance for most of the world)  and never having given weight while defeating older horses, as Easy Goer did in three races. He is Horse of the Year despite going one for three during a span of five months while Easy Goer won the Belmont, Whitney, Travers, Woodward and Jockey Club Gold Cup."

Easy Goer is the only horse in history to win the Whitney, Travers, Woodward, and Jockey Club Gold Cup.  In three of these races, he defeated older horses, becoming one of the few three-year-olds in modern American racing history to do so. Only three Hall of Fame champions (Easy Goer, Kelso, and Slew o' Gold) have ever won the Whitney, Woodward, and Jockey Club Gold Cup in the same year, but Easy Goer was the only three-year-old to complete the triple.   He is one of only two horses to ever win the Champagne, Belmont Stakes, and Travers.   He is also one of only two horses to notch a Belmont Stakes, Whitney, and Travers triple, and he was the only one to do so in the same year.   Additionally, he is one of only five horses to tally a Whitney-Travers double in the same year, with the other four being Key to the Mint, Eight Thirty, Alydar and Java Gold.   Since 1919, Easy Goer is one of only ten horses to sweep the Belmont, Travers, and Jockey Club Gold Cup.   Since 1973, Easy Goer is one of only eight horses that have won three consecutive Grade I races longer than  miles on dirt (or synthetic), with the other seven being Alysheba and Gentlemen as well as Triple Crown winners Justify, American Pharoah, Secretariat, Seattle Slew, and Affirmed.   He was one of the last American-trained horses to win two Grade I races at a mile and a half on dirt (Belmont Stakes and Jockey Club Gold Cup).  Easy Goer's 1989 three-year-old campaign is considered by some to be the greatest in American racing history without yielding any year-end championship awards.   With the exception of Horse of the Year, the Eclipse Awards are based on age, and from 1971 until the present time, the American Champion Older Male Horse award was restricted to male horses aged four years old and up. Prior to 1971, the American Champion Older Male Horse award was referred to as "Champion Handicap Male Horse."  The Daily Racing Form version was open to any horse ages three years old and up, and this award was given to some champions at the age of three, such as Citation, Buckpasser, Sword Dancer, Damascus, and Arts and Letters.  The three-year-old Easy Goer conceded weight on scale while defeating top older horses in both the Whitney (G1) and Woodward (G1) Handicaps; defeated leading older horses a third time in the weight-for-age Jockey Club Gold Cup (G1); and beat older horses again in the weight-for-age Breeders' Cup Classic (G1), including future Champion Older Male Blushing John. Had the awards been categorized as they were prior to 1971, Easy Goer most likely would have been named Champion Handicap Male Horse of 1989.

1990: four-year-old season
Twelve days later, he was third in the Grade I Metropolitan Mile, marking the only time he did not finish either first or second in his career. Easy Goer always had problematic ankles, and his handlers had to work overtime on them during the month. Rumors about his soundness had swirled around the track for the two weeks leading into the race. Easy Goer was beaten by a little more than a length behind eventual Horse of the Year Criminal Type and two-time sprint champion Housebuster while carrying considerably more weight than those competitors (fourteen and seven pounds, respectively). Future Horse of the Year and Breeders' Cup Classic winner Black Tie Affair and two-time Vosburgh Handicap winner Sewickley finished behind the top three. He then won the mile and a quarter Grade I Suburban Handicap by almost four lengths ridden out in a time of 2:00 after going head and head on the lead while sprinting through fast fractions of 46.75 for a half-mile and 1:09.87 for six furlongs. He defeated Jerome Handicap winner De Roche, as well as Brooklyn Handicap and Stuyvesant Handicap winner Montubio. The final time was 3/5 of a second off Alysheba's then track record, which had been set in a weight for age race. Easy Goer conceded  to his opponents. In Easy Goer's 20-race career, he was never defeated by more than  lengths.

After his Suburban Handicap win, Easy Goer was retired due to a bone chip in his right front ankle. He won 14 races, including 9 Grade I wins at seven furlongs, a mile, a mile and an eighth, a mile and a quarter, and a mile and a half while earning $4,873,770.

Stud record
After his retirement from racing, Easy Goer stood stud at Claiborne Farm in Paris, Kentucky. He was given the honor of occupying the number one stall in the number one barn. His stall was previously occupied by Bold Ruler and Secretariat. At age eight, in 1994, Easy Goer collapsed and died while jogging in his paddock at Claiborne Farm. Dr. Thomas Swerczek, the veterinary pathologist at the University of Kentucky, who conducted Easy Goer's necropsy, determined the horse died of an anaphylactic reaction to an undetermined allergen and also had cancerous tumors in multiple organs.  The veterinarians were convinced the cancer did not kill Easy Goer and probably would not have been fatal for a long time. They also said fatal allergic reactions are more common than most professionals realize.  Easy Goer was buried at Claiborne Farm along with Secretariat, Buckpasser, Bold Ruler and many other greats.

At stud, in just a few crops before his premature death, Easy Goer sired three Grade I winners and nine stakes winners (7%), from 136 foals, of which 101 were starters, and 74 were winners. While speed at distances up to a mile had been favored over "stoutness" in much American breeding, Easy Goer demonstrated speed over a mile as well as stamina. Given the combination of his pedigree and the high-quality mares to which he was bred at Claiborne, it was speculated by The Blood-Horse that he would have been even more significant as a stallion had he lived longer. Easy Goer has also been an influential broodmare sire. From 53 mares sired by Easy Goer, they have produced 23 stakes winners.

Notable offspring
Easy Goer was the sire  of:
 Will's Way - won the Whitney Handicap and Travers Stakes like his sire, and in turn sired Lion Tamer, winner of the Cigar Mile Handicap, Hutcheson Stakes, Commonwealth Stakes, and Gulfstream Park Sprint Championship. He also sired Maryland Sprint Handicap winner Willy o'the Valley. 
 My Flag -  won four Grade I races, including the 1995 Breeders' Cup Juvenile Fillies, Ashland Stakes, Coaching Club American Oaks and Gazelle Stakes, as well as the Bonnie Miss Stakes. She also placed against males in the 1996 Belmont Stakes. My Flag's dam was winner of the 1988 Breeders' Cup Distaff and 1996 Kentucky Broodmare of the Year Personal Ensign. My Flag in turn produced the champion Storm Flag Flying, winner of the 2002 Breeders' Cup Juvenile Fillies. She is also the dam of the graded stakes-placed On Parade, dam of multiple graded stakes winner Parading, the graded-stakes placed Protesting, dam of Discovery Handicap stakes-winner Performer, Tropical Park Derby stakes-winner Breaking the Rules, and stakes-winner With Flying Colors, who is the dam of multiple graded stakes winner Teresa Z. 
 Furlough - won the Ballerina Handicap, Distaff Handicap and Honorable Miss Handicap; and is the dam of Stakes Winners Happy Hunting and Pardon. She is also the dam of Pension, dam of Adirondack Stakes winner Thoughtfully, Futurity Stakes (USA) winner Annual Report and Mystic Lake Derby winner Giant Payday. 
 Composer - won the Jim Dandy Stakes. 
 Relaxing Rhythm - won the Molly Pitcher Handicap, Torrey Pines Stakes and Star Shoot Stakes, and is the dam of graded stakes winner Spring Waltz.
 Smooth Charmer - placed in both the Shuvee Handicap and Vagrancy Handicap, and is the dam of graded stakes winner Sea Chanter. 
 Promiscuous - won the Display Stakes.
 Jetto - won the Honeybee Stakes.

Notable descendants
Easy Goer is the broodmare sire (maternal grandsire) of: 
 Corinthian - won the Breeders' Cup Dirt Mile, Metropolitan Handicap and Gulfstream Park Handicap;  Corinthian is the sire of Prince Lucky, winner of the Gulfstream Park Handicap and Hal's Hope Stakes, as well as Smarty Jones Stakes winner Junebugred.
 Storm Flag Flying - Won the Eclipse Award Championship for top two year old filly and won four Grade I races, including the Breeders' Cup Juvenile Fillies, Frizette Stakes, Matron Stakes, and Personal Ensign Handicap, as well as the Shuvee Handicap. 
 Funny Moon - won the Coaching Club American Oaks and Shuvee Handicap. 
 Monba - won the Blue Grass Stakes.
 Astronomer Royal - won the Group I French 2000 Guineas and Greenlands Stakes, and is the sire of Athenia Stakes and Prix des Réservoirs Stakes winner Stellar Path.
 Magical Fantasy - won four Grade I races, including the Yellow Ribbon Stakes, Del Mar Oaks, Gamely Stakes, and John C. Mabee Handicap, as well as the Santa Barbara Handicap. 
 Mull of Kintyre - won the Gimcrack Stakes in England and sire of Araafa, winner of the St. James's Palace Stakes and Irish 2,000 Guineas. 
 Spring Waltz - won the Rampart Handicap.
 Desert Hero - won the San Rafael Stakes.
 Navesink River - won the Pan American Handicap and Gallant Fox Handicap.
 Happy Hunting - won the Aqueduct Handicap.
 Sea Chanter - won the Miesque Stakes. 
 Sue's Good News - won the Arlington Oaks, and is the dam of Breeders' Cup Juvenile Turf Sprint winner Bulletin and Tiz Miz Sue, who won the Ogden Phipps Handicap and the Azeri Stakes twice.  Sue's Good News is also the dam of Kateri, who is the dam of Glorious Song Stakes winner Souper Sensational.
 Easy Slam - dam of Jessamine Stakes winner Kitten Kaboodle. 
 Kindness - dam of Breeders' Cup Marathon winner London Bridge. 
 Fabulous Bonus - dam of Go For Wand Handicap winner Royal Lahaina. 
 Unbridled Jet - placed in the Pegasus Stakes and Long Branch Stakes, and ranked among the leading sires in New Jersey.
 Easyfromthegitgo - won the Iowa Derby and Lecomte Stakes. 
 Nolan's Cat - placed in the 2005 Belmont Stakes, Super Derby and Dominion Day Stakes. 
 Easy Grades - placed in the Santa Anita Derby and San Rafael Stakes.
 Unbridled Secret - dam of Barbara Fritchie Handicap winner My Wandy's Girl, who also was a champion three year old in Puerto Rico.
 On Parade - dam of Dixie Stakes and Ben Ali Stakes-winner Parading, and Parading sired Dragon Bay, winner of the Nijinsky Stakes and Eclipse Stakes;   On Parade is also the dam of the graded-stakes placed Protesting, dam of Discovery Handicap stakes winner Performer and Tropical Park Derby stakes winner Breaking the Rules. 
 Pension - dam of Adirondack Stakes winner Thoughtfully, Futurity Stakes (USA) winner Annual Report and Mystic Lake Derby winner Giant Payday.
 Dead Aim - dam of Fair Grounds Oaks and Delta Princess Stakes winner Quiet Temper.
 Throng - winner of the Native Dancer Stakes.
 With Flying Colors - stakes-winning dam of multiple graded stakes winner Teresa Z, winner of the Turnback The Alarm Handicap, Monmouth Oaks and Obeah Stakes.
 Silver Ticket - won the King Edward Stakes and Toronto Cup Stakes.
 Fahamore - dam of Blue Devil Bel, who is the dam of Audible, winner of the Grade I Florida Derby and Holy Bull Stakes;  Fahamore is also the dam of stakes winner Akilina, who is the dam of stakes winners Governor Malibu and Rieno Tesoro.

Honors and assessments
In 1997, Easy Goer was inducted into the National Museum of Racing and Hall of Fame.  In the Blood-Horse magazine ranking of the top 100 U.S. Thoroughbred champions of the 20th Century, Easy Goer was ranked #34.  Easy Goer won the Eclipse Award as American champion 2-year-old male in 1988.  Easy Goer graces the cover of the 2005 book, "Belmont Park: A Century of Champions,"  with paintings by Richard Stone Reeves and text by Edward L. Bowen.  Belmont Park, the renowned racetrack, has played host to some of Thoroughbred racing's greatest champions, from Man o' War and Citation to Secretariat and Cigar.  Belmont Park is known as "The Championship Track" because nearly every major American champion in racing history has competed on the racetrack.  Belmont Park, with its wide, sweeping turns and long homestretch, is considered one of the fairest racetracks.  The book chronicles seventy racehorses who competed from 1905 to 2005 thrilling fans, setting records, and becoming legends at the venerable New York track.  Easy Goer's rivalry with Sunday Silence was featured as the 17th chapter of Horse Racing's Greatest Rivalries (2008, Eclipse Press), a compilation produced by the staff of The Blood-Horse.  Easy Goer's duel with Sunday Silence in the 1989 Preakness was ranked #70 in Horse Racing's Top 100 Moments, a review of racing in the 20th century compiled by The Blood-Horse and released in 2006.  Easy Goer was retrospectively awarded a Timeform rating of 137 pounds, which was tied with his archrival Sunday Silence for second place among American runners of the 20th century. Only Cigar at 138 pounds was rated higher.  Easy Goer was one of thirty champion Thoroughbreds inducted into the Saratoga Hoofprints Walk of Fame as part of the inaugural class in 2013.  The Saratoga Hoofprints Walk of Fame is designed to pay homage to the most accomplished thoroughbreds to compete at Saratoga Race Course during its 150-year history. It honors the most prolific and notable horses to have raced at one of the nation's most historic tracks.  The Easy Goer Stakes run every Belmont Stakes day at Belmont Park is named in his honor.

See also
 List of historical horses

References

 Easy Goer's pedigree and photo
 Easy Goer's page in the Hall of Fame
 
 
  Search for Easy Goer articles in the New York Times

External links
 Easy Goer Profile at Hello Race Fans

1986 racehorse births
1994 racehorse deaths
Racehorses bred in Kentucky
Racehorses trained in the United States
Belmont Stakes winners
Eclipse Award winners
United States Thoroughbred Racing Hall of Fame inductees
Phipps family
American Grade 1 Stakes winners
Thoroughbred family 1-x
Horse racing track record setters